Wandana Sonalkar is an Indian economist, and an author and translator. She retired as Professor teaches at the Tata Institute of Social Sciences, Mumbai in 2017, and previously taught at the Babasaheb Ambedkar Marathwada University, Aurangabad. Her research focuses on gender and caste in India. She has published translations of several books from Marathi to English, including the autobiographies of Urmila Pawar and R.B. More, and in 2021, she published Why I am Not a Hindu Woman, an autobiography and critique of misogyny, caste and violence in the context of the Hindu religion.

Education and career 
Sonalkar studied mathematics and economics at the University of Cambridge, and earned a Ph.D. in economics from the Dr. Babasaheb Ambedkar Marathwada University, in India. She taught economics at the Dr. Babasaheb Ambedkar Marathwada University, and played a key role in establishing an institute there for women's studies. She also taught at Aurangabad University. She went on to teach economics and development at the Tata Institute of Social Sciences in India, in their Advanced Centre for Women's Studies and School of Development Studies. She later became the Director of the Tata Institute of Social Sciences' Tarabai Shinde Women's Studies Center. She is one of the founders of the Aalochana Centre for Documentation and Research on Women, a non-profit organization dedicated to research on caste and gender in India.

Sonalkar's research has been published in Economic and Political Weekly, the Asian Journal of Women's Studies, and Social Scientist. She has also worked on developing curricula that teach social sciences in India through bilingual communication.

Writing and translation 
Sonalkar has translated several books by Dalit authors from Marathi to English. These include We Also Made History: Women in the Ambedkarite Movement in Maharashtra by Urmila Pawar and Meenakshi Moon, Urmila Pawar's autobiography, The Weave of My Life, and the autobiography of Dalit activist R.B. More. Sonalkar's translation of R.B. More's autobiography was reviewed in The Hindu, and The Wire. She has also published shorter translated works of stories by Priya Tendulkar, Shyam Manohar, and others, in Indian Literature.

In 2021, Sonalkar published Why I am Not a Hindu Woman (Women Unlimited), a autobiographical work that is also a critique of misogyny, caste and violence in the context of the Hindu religion. The book was reviewed in The Hindu, The Tribune and Business Standard.

Bibliography 
Books 

 (2021) Why I am Not a Hindu Woman (Women Unlimited) 

Translations (from Marathi to English)

 (2009) Urmila Pawar, The Weave of My Life: a Dalit Woman's Memoirs (Columbia University Press) 
 (2019) Satyendra More, Memoirs of a Dalit Communist: The Many Worlds of R.B. More (ed. Anupama Rao, trans. Wandana Sonalkar, LeftWord) 
 (2014) We Also Made History: Women in the Ambedkarite Movement in Maharashtra by Urmila Pawar and Meenakshi Moon (trans. Wandana Sonalkar, Zubaan Books)

References 

Alumni of the University of Cambridge
Dr. Babasaheb Ambedkar Marathwada University alumni
Indian economists
21st-century Indian economists
21st-century Indian writers
21st-century Indian women writers
21st-century Indian translators
Living people
Year of birth missing (living people)